The Official Harpist to the Prince of Wales is a position within the Royal Household. In 2000, King Charles III, the then Prince of Wales, revived a tradition of having Welsh harpists, which was the first time the post has been occupied since it was last granted to John Thomas in 1871 by Queen Victoria.

The harp is an important national instrument in Wales, and although the role of Official Harpist was discontinued during the reign of Queen Victoria, the Prince of Wales restored the position in 2000 in order to foster and encourage young musical talent in Wales and the UK and to raise the profile of the harp as an instrument.

On 5 July 2006, the Prince of Wales was presented with a £150,000 gold leaf harp from harp maker Victor Salvi of the Italian harp makers Salvi Harps. The harp is used by the official harpist.

List of official harpists
John Thomas, 1871
 Catrin Finch, 2000 to 2004 
 Jemima Phillips, 2004 to 2007 
 Claire Jones, 2007 to 2011
 Hannah Stone, 2011 to 2015 
 Anne Denholm, 2015 to 2019 
 Alis Huws, 2019 onwards

References

External links
 The Prince of Wales Official Website

Positions within the British Royal Household
2000 establishments in Wales
Harpists
Harp